Ian Ritchie Comrie-Thomson (c. 1903 – c. 1982) was a rugby union player who represented Australia.

Comrie-Thomson, a prop, claimed a total of 5 international rugby caps for Australia.

References

Australian rugby union players
Australia international rugby union players
Year of death missing
Year of birth uncertain
Rugby union props